Tamil Nadu's Tamil Official Language and Tamil Culture Minister K Pandiarajan have announced that the anglicised names of around 3,000 places in the State would be changed into Tamil. The names of places in Tamil will be transliterated into English. The renaming of places has come into effect by a G.O. passed by Govt. of Tamil Nadu. The order follows an announcement in the assembly two years ago that anglicised names of the areas be changed closer to their original names in Tamil.

History 
The renaming of cities in India started in 1947 following the end of the British imperial period. The most notable are Indian English spelling-changes of Orissa to Odisha (March 2011) and the Union Territory of Pondicherry (which includes the City of Pondicherry) to Puducherry.

Lists by District

Chennai

Cuddalore

Sivagangai

Dharmapuri

Tiruvallur

Pudukottai

Krishnagiri

Tiruppur

Tuticorin

Perambalur

Kancheepuram

Coimbatore

Tiruvannamalai

Nagapattinam

Virudhunagar

Karur

Villupuram

Salem

Tiruchirappalli

Theni

Kanyakumari

Vellore

Madurai

Dindigul

Erode

Tiruvarur

Thanajvur

Namakkal

References

Tamil Nadu